

Classification 

The winning roster of OKK Beograd:
  Miodrag Nikolić
  Slobodan Gordić
  Radivoj Korać
  Dušan Gajin
  Trajko Rajković
  Slobodan Miloradović
  Ljubomir Lucić
  Frane Bosiočić
  Bogomir Rajković
  Bruno Pavelić
  Dragutin Tošić
  Milorad Erkić
  Branko Kosović
  Vojislav Jovanović
  Marko Marković

Coach:  Borislav Stanković

Scoring leaders
 Radivoj Korać (OKK Beograd) – ___ points (37.0 ppg)
 ???
 ???

Qualification in 1960-61 season European competitions 

FIBA European Champions Cup
 OKK Beograd (champions)

References

Yugoslav First Basketball League seasons